Persoonia glaucescens, commonly known as the Mittagong geebung, is a species of flowering plant in the family Proteaceae and is endemic to New South Wales. It is an erect shrub with smooth bark, hairy young branchlets, lance-shaped leaves with the narrower end towards the base, and yellow flowers. It is the only persoonia in eastern Australia with strongly glaucous leaves.

Description
Flowering occurs from January to May and the fruit is a fleshy green drupe with purple markings, and contain a single seed. This species is the only persoonia in eastern Australia to have strongly glaucous leaves.

Taxonomy
Persoonia glaucescens was first formally described in 1827 by Kurt Polycarp Joachim Sprengel in the 17th edition of Systema Vegetabilium from an unpublished description by Franz Sieber. In 1848, Stephan Endlicher reduced the species to a variety as Persoonia lanceolata var. glaucescens.

Lawrie Johnson originally thought that P. lanceolata and the present species grew in separate areas, and gave it the name Persoonia subsp. B, but more recent fieldword by Peter Weston showed that they do sometimes grow together without appearing to interbreed. As a result, Weston reinstated the name P. glaucescens, publishing the change in the journal Telopea.

Within the genus, P. glaucescens is classified in the Lanceolata group, a group of 58 closely related species with similar flowers but very different foliage. These species will often interbreed with each other where two members of the group occur.

Distribution and habitat
Mittagong geebung occurs in small scattered patches in an area bordered by Buxton to the north and Berrima to the south, having vanished from the vicinities of Thirlmere Lakes and Fitzroy Falls. It is found in dry sclerophyll eucalypt forest with such trees as red bloodwood (Corymbia gummifera), scribbly gum (Eucalyptus sclerophylla), Sydney peppermint (E. piperita), silvertop ash (E. sieberi), narrow-leaved stringybark (E. sparsifolia), grey gum (E. punctata) and, at higher elevations, snow gum (E. pauciflora). The increased light and lack of competing plants means the species adapts preferably to (and can be found on) road verges.

Conservation status
Persoonia glaucescens is classified as "vulnerable" under the Australian Government Environment Protection and Biodiversity Conservation Act 1999 and as "endangered" under the New South Wales Government Biodiversity Conservation Act 2016. The main threats to the species include trail and road maintenance, inappropriate fire regimes and grazing.

References

glaucescens
Flora of New South Wales
Plants described in 1827
Taxa named by Franz Sieber
Taxa named by Kurt Polycarp Joachim Sprengel